Gian Singh (born 2 July 1959) is an Indian wrestler. He competed in the men's freestyle 62 kg at the 1984 Summer Olympics.

References

1959 births
Living people
Indian male sport wrestlers
Olympic wrestlers of India
Wrestlers at the 1984 Summer Olympics
Place of birth missing (living people)
Wrestlers at the 1982 Asian Games
Asian Games competitors for India